Josef Schmid may refer to:

 Josef Schmid (athlete) (born 1953), German middle-distance runner
 Josef Schmid (composer) (1890–1969), American conductor, composer, and composition teacher
 Josef Schmid (flight surgeon) (born 1965), NASA flight surgeon
 Josef Schmid (theologian) (1883–1975), German Catholic theologian
 Joseph Schmid (1901–1956), Luftwaffe general